Henry Eaton (24 March 1891 – 18 March 1962) was an Australian rules footballer for the Port Adelaide Football Club.

References

Port Adelaide Football Club (SANFL) players
Port Adelaide Football Club players (all competitions)
Australian rules footballers from South Australia
1891 births
1962 deaths